Neđo Šuka (born 13 August 1987) is a Bosnian Serb football forward who last played for FK Modriča in the Second League of the Republika Srpska.

Club career
He previously played for Sutjeska Foča, Rudar Prijedor, Mladost Velika Obarska, Donji Srem and Koraza Gradiška. After leaving Borac Šamac in summer 2016 he returned to Sutjeska once again.

He left Modriča in January 2019.

Honours
Individual:
 First League of the Republika Srpska top-scorer: 2014–15 (with Kozara & Drina HE, 11 goals)

References

External links
 
 Stats at utakmica.rs
 2014/15 stats at FSRS

1987 births
Living people
People from Sokolac
Association football forwards
Bosnia and Herzegovina footballers
FK Sutjeska Foča players
FK Rudar Prijedor players
FK Mladost Velika Obarska players
FK Donji Srem players
FK Kozara Gradiška players
FK Goražde players
FK Borac Šamac players
FK Modriča players
Premier League of Bosnia and Herzegovina players
Serbian SuperLiga players
First League of the Republika Srpska players
Bosnia and Herzegovina expatriate footballers
Expatriate footballers in Serbia
Bosnia and Herzegovina expatriate sportspeople in Serbia